Alexander Slavik (* 27 December 1900 in Budweis, † 19 April 1997 in Vienna) was a sociological scientist, ethnologist, Nazi and professor in Vienna, who also worked on cultural themes. During the Second World War, Slavik worked as a cryptographer and translator on the Japanese desk of the Cipher Department of the High Command of the Wehrmacht. He continued to work in his old age, and was recently working on collecting material for a work on the Susanoo-no-Mikoto and the cultural history of the Izumo area in ancient Japan (History of Japan) He was a pioneer of Japanology and Japanese ethnological studies in Vienna.

Life
Alexander Slawik was the son of an Imperial and Royal (German:kaiserlich und königlich) (Abbr. KuK) officer family who was part of the Austria-Hungary Monarchy and grew up in Kraków, where his father was commander of the city. Slawik became interested in the Japan and the Japanese language, in discussion with his father, who was interested in the Russo-Japanese War and who made significant contributions to the corpus. During his time, his father purchased a course in Chinese grammar, which was bought in Vienna. He then undertook a study of a Japanese course, and while he was in pupil in Secondary school, undertook extensive study of Kojiki and Nihon Shoki at Krems an der Donau.

As an 18-year-old, he found himself destitute and penniless in Vienna after the end of the war in 1918 and a failed apprenticeship as a metalworker. He then began to study law in order to make a living, but when he failed his staatsexamen, (state exams) he was only too happy to give up this career in favour of East Asian studies. He earned his livelihood at this time as a commercial employee, working as a clerk at Siemens-Schuckert (1924–31).

Through his contacts with the small Japanese community in Vienna he remained in contact with the field. Slavik came into contact with the Austrian diplomat, former imperial envoy in Beijing and sinologist Arthur von Rosthorn, who would later become an mentor. Through discussions with Rosthorn, Slawik  formulated a dissertation through the study of early contacts between Japan, Korea and China during the Han dynasty. However, Slawik was informed by the deans office that the University of Vienna, where his mentor Rosthorn held an honorary professor,  that it was not possible to obtain a doctorate, since at that time the disciplines of sinology and Japanology did not yet exist in Vienna. Through his Vienna circle, he met the poet, neurologist and psychiatrist Mokichi Saitō  where the discussed Tanka stories and the ethnologist Masao Oka (岡正雄)  who would have a profound effect on Salwik. In 1931, he returned to study with a focus on Japanese ethnogenesis,  where he was promoted to Dr. Phil with a thesis called: Cultural strata in Old Korea (German:Kulturschichten in Alt-Korea)

Career

A planned appointment to the Fujian University of the SVD Order, which later became the Fujian Normal University in Beijing was prevented by the outbreak of the Second Sino-Japanese War in East Asia. He then taught as a lecturer for Japanese language at the Consular Academy in Vienna, later also at the University of Vienna. At that time he was already engaged in the underground for the Nazi Party, which would later lead to his dismissal from the state service in 1945.

Together with Professor Oka, he established research at the Japan Institute. This institute was donated by Baron Mitsui Takaharu (高原 高原) in 1937/38. In 1939, he was conscripted.

Through his efforts to preserve the Japan Institute and particularly its library, he gained the trust of the anthropologist, Professor Wilhelm Koppers, who was director of the Institute of Ethnology at the University of Vienna.  Starting from 1948 he was appointed as an assistant Professor, then assistant to Koppers, particularly with the establishment of the library at the university. He later became the head of a Japan department. From 1964 he was promoted to Professor extraordinarius, within the Institute of Ethnology, which was transferred to an independent institute for Japanese studies in 1965. He was the director until his retirement in 1971.

For the first time, he visited Japan, with the support of UNESCO (Paris) during  1957-58. During the stay, he undertook field studies at the Ainu and in Kyushu villages (Kyushu). The collected Ainu of the Saru Valley cult objects are an important part of the collection of the Museum of Ethnology, Vienna.

At the invitation of the Japanese Foreign Ministry in 1966, he researched in the Fukuoka area. During 1968-69, further work on Hokkaido and Kyushu laid the cornerstone of the interdisciplinary project, developed and managed by him, whose aim was the comprehensive recording of the culture of a historically comprehensible space. The result of this long-standing project, a documentation on the topography, social and economic history, the rural equipment inventory as well as the situation of the Burakumin in the Aso basin (Asō Bay), is available in three volumes.

Among the pupils of Slawik, who themselves made a name for themselves for Japanese studies of the "Wiener Schule", were Josef Kreiner, Peter Pantzer and Sepp Linhart.

Slawik spent his life in a Viennese retirement home. He was buried at the Vienna Central Cemetery.

War work

During the Second World War, Dr Slawik, along with Dr Wolfgang Schmal, ran the Japanese desk of the language department of Cipher Department of the High Command of the Wehrmacht  as he was the most experienced individual with Second Lieutenant Dr Walter Adler in command. Little is known of Wolfgang Schmal or Walter Adler.

Awards

 Order of the Sacred Treasure 3rd class: 1966, 2nd class with star: 1987
 Prize of the Japan Foundation 1989
 Honorary Cross for Science and Art 1st Class
 Golden sign of honor for merits around the country of Vienna

References

1900 births
1997 deaths
German cryptographers
Japanese ethnologists